is a 1950 Japanese anti-war film directed by Senkichi Taniguchi. Co-written by Taniguchi and Akira Kurosawa, the film is based on Story of a Prostitute by Taijiro Tamura. The film revolves around a tragic affair between a soldier involved in the Manchurian campaign and a prostitute.

The film received two awards at the Mainichi Film Concours and was later remade by Seijun Suzuki at Nikkatsu.

Plot
Mikami, a Japanese soldier serving in China, is captured by Chinese forces. Although he is able to escape, he is treated with contempt by his peers. After falling in love with a prostitute named Harumi, she convinces him to desert the army and live with her.

Cast 
 Ryō Ikebe as Mikami
 Yoshiko Yamaguchi as Harumi 
 Eitaro Ozawa as Adjutant 
 Hajime Izu as Oda
 Haruo Tanaka as Noro
 Setsuko Wakayama as Kaoru

Release
Escape at Dawn was released in Japan on 8 January 1950 where it was distributed by Shintoho.

Reception
Escape at Dawn was ranked as the third-best Japanese film of 1950 by Kinema Junpo critics. The film received two awards at the Mainichi Film Concours: Best Cinematography and Best Sound.

References

Footnotes

Sources

External links
 
 

1950 films
Japanese black-and-white films
1950s Japanese-language films
1950s war drama films
Japanese war drama films
Films based on Japanese novels
Films directed by Senkichi Taniguchi
Films scored by Fumio Hayasaka
Films with screenplays by Akira Kurosawa
Films produced by Tomoyuki Tanaka
Toho films
Shintoho films
Films with screenplays by Senkichi Taniguchi
1950 drama films
Japanese World War II films
1950s Japanese films